The second season of the animated television series, Archer originally aired in the United States on the cable network FX. This season started on January 27, 2011, with "Swiss Miss" and ended with "Double Trouble" on April 21, 2011, with a total of thirteen episodes.

Episodes

Home media

References

External links 
 
 

2011 American television seasons
Archer (2009 TV series) seasons